A Phaeozem in the World Reference Base for Soil Resources (WRB) is a dark soil with a high base status, but without a secondary carbonates within one metre of the soil surface. Phaeozems correlate with the Udolls and Aquolls (Mollisols) of the USDA soil taxonomy.

These soils are found mainly in humid and sub-humid tall-grass steppes; there are extensive areas of them in the United States, Argentina and China. Phaeozems form from unconsolidated sediments such as loess and glacial till and typically have organic matter contents of about 5% and a pH of 5–7.

Intensive agricultural use is widespread and includes wheat, soybean and cotton production and improved pastures for cattle.

See also 
Pedogenesis
Pedology
Soil classification

References
 IUSS Working Group WRB: World Reference Base for Soil Resources, fourth edition. International Union of Soil Sciences, Vienna 2022. .

Further reading
 W. Zech, P. Schad, G. Hintermaier-Erhard: Soils of the World. Springer, Berlin 2022, Chapter 5.3.1.

External links 
 profile photos (with classification) WRB homepage
 profile photos (with classification) IUSS World of Soils

Pedology
Types of soil